Dhadar, also spelt Dadhar, is the capital of the Kachhi District in the Balochistan province of Pakistan. The town which also consists of one Union Council is the headquarters of the tehsil of the same name. It is located at 29°28'0"N 67°39'0"E and has an altitude of 132 metres (436 feet).

The two main tribes of this district are Lashari and Rind.

References

Populated places in Kachhi District
Union councils of Balochistan, Pakistan